East Bendigo is an suburb of the regional city of Bendigo in north central Victoria, Australia,  north east of the Bendigo city centre.

A primary school was opened in 1916 and closed in 1998.

References

External links

Towns in Victoria (Australia)
Bendigo